Tryphera is a genus of flies in the family Tachinidae.

Species
T. nox Hall, 1939

References

Diptera of North America
Exoristinae
Tachinidae genera